Dave Barry (born David Louis Siegel; August 26, 1918 – August 16, 2001) was an American actor, stand-up comedian and voice-over artist. He is well known for his role as an actor in Playgirl, High Society, Voice in the Mirror, Some Like It Hot and How To Seduce a Woman.

Biography

Early life 
Dave Barry (family name David Siegel, last name legally changed in the 1940s) began his performing career in the 1930s at the age of sixteen with parts in radio and doing voice work for cartoons. The son of a furniture store owner, he made his debut on the radio talent show Major Bowes Amateur Hour as did Sara Berner, another talented female voice-over artist with whom he later worked. He built up a reputation as a stand-up comedian, entertaining troops during his military service in World War II on shows like Command Performance with Mary Pickford in 1942 just a few months after the United States entered the war. 

Barry started as a Borscht Belt comic in the Catskill Mountains while serving in the United States Army during World War II and traveling with the United Service Organizations (USO) along with Bob Hope, Jimmy Durante, Eddie Cantor, Red Skelton and many celebrities of the time. Starting in the mid-1940s, Barry became something of a fixture in Las Vegas just as the city was starting to become famous, playing engagements at the Flamingo, Desert Inn and the El Rancho Hotel.performing with celebrities of the day such as Betty Grable, Anna Maria Alberghetti, Rose Marie, Sammy Davis Jr., Debbie Reynolds and later Wayne Newton. 

In 1966, Barry headlined the Desert Inn variety musical show "Hello America," and later "Hooray for Hollywood," which were produced by Vegas extravaganza king Donn Arden. Later, for nearly a decade in the 1970s, Barry provided the opening act for Midnight Idol Wayne Newton, warming audiences at a variety of Howard Hughes-owned Hotels (the Sands, The Desert Inn and the Frontier).

Voice acting career 
Because Barry excelled at mimicry and mastered an endless stream of accents/dialects and offbeat sounds, when he moved to Hollywood in the early 1940s, he sought out more cartoon voice work with Columbia, Warner Bros., Disney, Republic Pictures, and Screen Gems. He became sought after as an animation voice actor in the mid 1930s at the age of just 18, hired by the legendary Warner Bros. (Merrie Melodies) mogul Leon Schlesinger with the Hollywood-themed The Coo-Coo Nut Grove (1936), where he voiced actor Ned Sparks, Porky's Road Race (1937) and then a year later with Disney with the celebrity-filled Mother Goose Goes Hollywood (1938). Barry partnered with many of the most creative minds of early animation, and animated voice work (especially celebrities) became a lucrative side gig supplementing his comedy résumé and income. During a 1942 Miami stand-up performance, he was doing his stand-up act at a hotel when a man from the audience (who worked for the Miami-based Famous Studios) approached him at the bar after the show. He said they needed a deeply baritone voice for Popeye's nemesis Bluto in a series of Popeye features. Barry got the Miami job starting with the patriotic Seein' Red, White 'N' Blue (1943). Barry provided the deeply baritone swaggering voice for Bluto between 1942 and 1944 in six Popeye cartoons.

Barry's work in cartoons grew as animation gained popularity, voicing countless credited (and mostly uncredited) features . His most sought-after skill was uncannily impersonating celebrities of the period, including Groucho Marx, Humphrey Bogart, Cary Grant, James Cagney and Clark Gable, which he did with gusto in countless Looney Tunes and Merrie Melodies cartoons. He also voiced Elmer Fuddstone in Pre-Hysterical Hare (1958), standing in for Arthur Q. Bryan when he was ill and not able to voice him. For Looney Tunes, Dave Barry became best known for numerous appearances of Humphrey Bogart and other classic celebrities in cartoons such as Bacall to Arms (1946), 8 Ball Bunny (1950) and the star-studded Hollywood Steps Out (1941). He also voiced many nameless background characters.

Barry also performed a series of distinctive radio announcer voices for the famous "Marilyn Monroe Is Getting Married" radio episode on the Edgar Bergen show (October 26, 1952) with Marilyn Monroe and Bergen's ventriloquist dummy Charlie McCarthy.

He also provided numerous voices for Capitol Records children's albums in the 1950s like "Bozo Under The Sea" with Pinto Colvig, Bugs Bunny, Merrie Melodies, Pink Panther, Popeye the Sailor, Roland and Rattfink and Sniffles along with Elmer Fudd and Mr. Magoo.

Barry also worked with well known voice actor Daws Butler on a number of novelty records in the 1960s including Capitol Records "Dog's Best Friend / H-H-Him".

His last voice-over role was on The Pink Panther Laugh-and-a-Half Hour-and-a-Half Show in 1976. Previously, he had voiced various spies in the Pink Panther short "Pinkfinger" in 1965.

Film and television career 
At the end of the 1940s, Barry began also to garner roles in both film and television. He appeared with Marilyn Monroe in the B-movie Ladies of the Chorus (1948), and 11 years later, he was reunited with her in what was perhaps his most famous role: bumbling band manager Beinstock in Billy Wilder's comedy Some Like It Hot (1959).

He appeared on The Ed Sullivan Show in the 1950s. He also guest-starred on television series such as 87th Precinct, Green Acres, The Monkees, Get Smart, I Dream of Jeannie, Emergency!, and in his final role as Jack Brice in the 1978 episode High Rollers of Flying High on CBS.

In 1963, Barry was cast as Harry in the episode "Has Anyone Seen Eddie?" of Going My Way, with Gene Kelly, an adaptation of the 1944 film of the same name.

Nightclub career 
Barry also worked as a club entertainer and comedian in Las Vegas. He started working stand-up in Vegas in 1946 at the El Rancho Vegas and the original Last Frontier, and later at the El Cortez and the Hacienda Resort. He worked as the opening act for famous performers such as Frank Sinatra, Judy Garland, and many more. He appeared with Wayne Newton at the height of Newton's popularity for more than a decade in the 1970s at the Frontier, Sands, and Desert Inn.

Barry also appeared regularly in comedy clubs across the U.S.: Chicago (Chez Paree); San Francisco (Bimbo's 365 Club); New York (Paramount Theatre ); Austin Texas (The Paramount); Florida (The Americana); and Los Angeles (Billy Gray's Band Box, Slapsy Maxie's Nightclub, The Moulin Rouge, The Chi Chi, The Cocoanut Grove at the Ambassador Hotel, Charlie Foy's Supper Club,  and Ciro's).

Nightclub work paired Barry with top names of the period, including Sammy Davis Jr., Judy Garland, Della Reese, Frank Sinatra, Liberace, The Four Step Brothers, Gypsy Rose Lee, and Tommy Dorsey. In June 1949, Barry was flown in for a one-month engagement at the London Palladium with The Marx Brothers (Harpo Marx and Chico Marx).

Personal life and death 
Barry was the father of five children (Alan, Kerry, Steve, Dana, and Wendy) and was married to his wife, singer Ginny (Ginger), for over 50 years until his death from cancer in 2001.

Filmography

Film

Discography

Television

References

External links
 

1918 births
2001 deaths
20th-century American male actors
Warner Bros. Cartoons voice actors
American male radio actors
American male film actors
American male voice actors
American male television actors
American male comedians
Jewish American comedians
Jewish American male actors
Male actors from New York City
Comedians from New York City
20th-century American comedians
American impressionists (entertainers)
Burials at Mount Sinai Memorial Park Cemetery
Deaths from cancer in California